MV Straitsman is a roll-on/roll-off ferry in service for StraitNZ in New Zealand. Under the Bluebridge brand, it operates two return crossings per day between Wellington and Picton, linking the North and South Islands of New Zealand.

The ferry entered service with Bornholmertrafikken in 2005 as MS Dueodde. Alongside sister ship MS Hammerodde, she  operated routes linking Bornholm with the Danish mainland. It entered service with Strait Shipping in 2010, and was renamed Straitsman in recognition of Strait Shipping's first vessel, which was in service for 11 years from when the company first launched in 1992.

In March 2023 it was confirmed that the vessel had been secured by Condor Ferries in the UK for services between Portsmouth and the Channel Islands.

Accidents 
In July 2016, a tug and B-train trailer unit aboard the Straitsman snapped its lashings and fell overboard off the coast of Island Bay.
Abouth 20th February 2023, a crewmember got hit by a truck reversing onboard at Wellington, causing delays. The crewmember suffered bruising and a broken wrist

References

External links
 Strait Shipping - Straitsman information

Cook Strait ferries
2005 ships
Ships built in the Netherlands